Maggie Wallace Glover (born August 29, 1948) is a former American Democratic politician. She was the first African-American woman to be elected as a member of the South Carolina Senate, serving from 1992 to 2004. Glover was also a member of the South Carolina House of Representatives from 1989 to 1992.

Glover was born in Florence, South Carolina, the daughter of Ethel (née Greene) and Fulton Wallace. She received a B.A. from Fayetteville State University in 1970, and an M.Ed. from Francis Marion College in 1982.

References

External links
Senator Maggie Wallace Glover

1948 births
Living people
African-American state legislators in South Carolina
African-American women in politics
Fayetteville State University alumni
Francis Marion University alumni
Democratic Party members of the South Carolina House of Representatives
People from Florence, South Carolina
21st-century African-American people
20th-century African-American people
20th-century African-American women
21st-century African-American women

Women state legislators in South Carolina
Women in the South Carolina State Senate